Cooperstown Township is a township in Griggs County, North Dakota, United States.

History
There was a meeting called by the county clerk of Griggs County on February 9, 1888 at 2 PM for organizing Township 146-59, also known as Cooperstown Township.  The first township records were destroyed.

Demographics
Its population during the 2010 census was 56.

Location within Griggs County
Cooperstown Township is located in Township 146 Range 59 west of the Fifth principal meridian.

References

Townships in Griggs County, North Dakota